Poland competed at the 1980 Summer Olympics in Moscow, USSR. 306 competitors, 232 men and 74 women, took part in 162 events in 21 sports.

Medalists

Gold
 Bronisław Malinowski — Athletics, Men's 3000 m Steeplechase 
 Władysław Kozakiewicz — Athletics, Men's Pole Vault
 Jan Kowalczyk — Equestrian, Jumping Individual

Silver
 Leszek Dunecki, Zenon Licznerski, Marian Woronin, and Krzysztof Zwoliński — Athletics, Men's 4 × 100 m Relay 
 Jacek Wszola — Athletics, Men's High Jump
 Tadeusz Ślusarski — Athletics, Men's Pole Vault 
 Urszula Kielan — Athletics, Women's High Jump
 Paweł Skrzecz — Boxing, Men's Light Heavyweight
 Czesław Lang — Cycling, Men's Individual Road Race
 Janusz Bobik, Wiesław Hartman, Jan Kowalczyk, and Marian Kozicki — Equestrian, Jumping Team
 Piotr Jablkowski, Andrzej Lis, Mariusz Strzalka, and Leszek Swornowski — Fencing, Men's Épée Team 
 Małgorzata Dłużewska and Czesława Kościańska — Rowing, Women's  Coxless Pairs 
 Józef Lipień — Wrestling, Men's Greco-Roman Bantamweight
 Andrzej Supron — Wrestling, Men's Greco-Roman Lightweight
 Jan Dołgowicz — Wrestling, Men's Greco-Roman Middleweight
 Roman Bierła — Wrestling, Men's Greco-Roman Heavyweight
 Władysław Stecyk — Wrestling, Men's Freestyle Flyweight

Bronze
 Lucyna Langer — Athletics, Women's 100 m Hurdles 
 Krzysztof Kosedowski — Boxing, Men's Featherweight
 Kazimierz Adach — Boxing, Men's Lightweight
 Kazimierz Szczerba — Boxing, Men's Welterweight
 Jerzy Rybicki — Boxing, Men's Middleweight
 Lech Koziejowski, Adam Robak, Marian Sypniewski, and Bogusław Zych — Fencing, Men's Foil Team 
 Barbara Wysoczańska — Fencing, Women's Foil Individual
 Janusz Pawłowski — Judo, Men's Half Lightweight (65 kg)
 Ryszard Kubiak, Grzegorz Nowak, Ryszard Stadniuk, Grzegorz Stellak, and Adam Tomasiak — Rowing, Men's Coxed Fours 
 Agnieszka Czopek — Swimming, Women's 400 m Individual Medley 
 Tadeusz Dembończyk — Weightlifting, Men's Bantamweight
 Marek Seweryn — Weightlifting, Men's Featherweight 
 Tadeusz Rutkowski — Weightlifting, Men's Super Heavyweight 
 Aleksander Cichoń — Wrestling, Freestyle Light Heavyweight
 Adam Sandurski — Wrestling, Men's Freestyle Super Heavyweight

Archery

Poland entered two women and one man in its third appearance in Olympic archery.
Men

Women

Athletics

Men
Track & road events

Field events

Combined events – Decathlon

Women
Track & road events

Field events

Combined events – Pentathlon

Basketball

Preliminary round

Group B

Classification round
Results between Poland vs. Senegal, Australia vs. Sweden and Czechoslovakia vs. India were carried over from the preliminary round.

Boxing

Men

Canoeing

Sprint
Men

Women

Cycling

Road

Track

1000m time trial

Men's Sprint

Pursuit

Diving

Men

Women

Equestrian

Dressage

Eventing

Show jumping

Fencing

18 fencers, 13 men and 5 women, represented Poland in 1980.

Men

Individual

Team

Women

Individual

Team

Gymnastics

Artistic
Men

Women

Handball

Preliminary round
12 teams played each other in two groups to decide for which place each of them will compete in the Final Round.

Group A

Final Round

7th place match

Team roster

 - 7th place

 Andrzej Kacki
 Zbigniew Gawlik
 Piotr Czaczka
 Marek Panas
 Jerzy Garpiel

 Jerzy Klempel
 Janusz Brzozowski
 Zbigniew Tłuczyński
 Grzegorz Kosma
 Mieczysław Wojczak

 Daniel Waszkiewcz
 Ryszard Jedliński
 Henryk Rozmiarek
 Alfred Kaluzinski

Head coach

Hockey

Men's team competition

Preliminary round

Classification

Third place match

Team roster
 - 4th place

 Zygfryd Józefiak
 Andrzej Mikina
 Krystian Bak
 Włodzimierz Stanisławski
 Leszek Hensler
 Jan Sitek

 Jerzy Wybieralski
 Leszek Tórz
 Zbigniew Rachwalski
 Henryk Horwat
 Andrzej Mysliwiec

 Leszek Andrzejczak
 Jan Mielniczak
 Mariusz Kubiak
 Adam Dolatowski
 Krzysztof Glodowski

Head coach

Women's team competition

Preliminary Pool

Team roster
 - 6th place

 Małgorzata Gajewska
 Bogumila Pajor
 Jolanta Sekulak
 Jolanta Bledowska
 Lucyna Matuszna
 Danuta Stanislawska

 Wiesława Ryłko
 Lidia Zgajewska
 Maria Kornek
 Małgorzata Lipska
 Halina Koldras

 Lucyna Siejka
 Dorota Bielska
 Dorota Zaleczna
 Michalina Plekaniec
 Jadwiga Koldras

Head coach

Judo

Men

Modern pentathlon

Three male pentathletes represented Poland in 1980.

Rowing

Men

Women

Sailing

Open

Shooting

Open

Swimming

Men

Women

Volleyball

Preliminary round

Pool B

|}

|}

1st–4th places

Semifinals

|}

Bronze medal match

|}

Team roster
 - 4th place

 Robert Malinowski
 Maciej Jarosz
 Wiesław Czaja
 Lech Lasko

 Tomasz Wójtowicz
 Wiesław Gawłowski
 Wojciech Drzyzga
 Bogusław Kanicki

 Ryszard Bosek
 Włodzimierz Nalazek
 Leszek Molenda
 Władysław Kustra

Head coach

Weightlifting

Men

Wrestling

Men's freestyle

Men's Greco-Roman

References

Nations at the 1980 Summer Olympics
1980 Summer Olympics
1980 in Polish sport